In the United States, Extended School Year (ESY) services are designed to support a student with a disability as documented under the Individuals with Disabilities Education Act (IDEA) to maintain the academic, social/behavioral, communication, or other skills that they have learned as part of their Individualized Education Program (IEP) or Section 504 accommodation plan. In order for a student to receive ESY services, the student must have evidenced substantial regression and recoupment issues during the previous IEP year and/or there is evidence of emerging skills which are often referred to as "breakthrough" skills. The focus of the services provided to the student as part of an ESY program are generally not upon learning new skills or "catching up" to grade level, but rather to provide practice to maintain previously acquired or learned skills. In some cases ESY is focused on continuing education for students whose rate of progress is insufficient to enable effective progress during the regular school year. If a student has received ESY services in previous years the student may not be eligible in future years as determinations for eligibility of ESY services are made annually by the IEP or 504 plan (which includes the parent and student of age 16 or older. NOTE: The mandatory age at which a student must be included varies by State but the Federal law states no later than age 16.)  

(a) General.
 Under the re-authorization of IDEA, effective July 1, 2005, each public agency must ensure that extended school year services are available as necessary to provide Free Appropriate Public Education (FAPE), consistent with paragraph (a)(2).
 Extended school year services must be provided only if a child's IEP Team determines, on an individual basis, in accordance with Sec. Sec. 300.320 through 300.324, that the services are necessary for the provision of FAPE to the child.
 In implementing the requirements of this section, a public agency may not—
 Limit extended school year services to particular categories of disability; or
 Unilaterally limit the type, amount, or duration of those services.

(b) Definition. 
As used in this section, the term extended school year services means special education and related services that--
 Are provided to a child with a disability—
 Beyond the normal school year of the public agency;
 In accordance with the child's IEP; and
 At no cost to the parents of the child; and
 Meet the standards of the State education agency (SEA).

(Authority: 20 U.S.C. 1412(a)(1))

References
 http://idea.ed.gov/explore/view/p/,root,regs,300,B,300%252E106,

Special education
United States federal education legislation